Sprowston Community Academy is a coeducational secondary school located in Sprowston, Norwich, Norfolk, England.

Description
Ofsted visiting the school, found a larger than average-sized secondary school where an overwhelming majority of students are of White British heritage. The proportion of students eligible for the pupil premium (additional government funding for students known to be eligible for free school meals, in the care of the local authority, or from service families is below the national average. The proportion of disabled students and those who have special educational needs is marginally higher than the national average and the proportion supported at school action plus, or with a statement of special educational needs is also marginally above the national average.

Until the end of the 2011/12 academic year, the school participated in a consortium sixth form arrangement. This has been dismantled.  Year 12 and 13 students are taught entirely on site.

Curriculum
Virtually all maintained schools and academies follow the National Curriculum, and are inspected by Ofsted on how well they succeed in delivering a 'broad and balanced curriculum'. Sprowston aims to teach a broad curriculum as long as feasible. This means they choose to teach a three-year Key Stage 3 where students study core subjects.

French and Spanish are the languages taught.

In Key Stage 5 the choice of subject is rationalised by offering 5 pathways- Academic to do the 3 A levels needed for university entrance, Extended academic with 4 A levels, Applied for Level 3 vocational courses, Applied Academic which is a combination of A levels and Level 3s and finally their Employability Pathway for Level 2 vocational courses.

Fundraising
In March 2012, the school raised £879.98 for Sport Relief and also £883.14 for SCOPE and the Hamlet Centre in Norwich.

Cheerleading
The school is where the Norwich-based Cheerleading group East Coast Emeralds train.

References

External links

Secondary schools in Norfolk
Schools in Norwich
Academies in Norfolk